Sangameshwara is a village in the Kalaghatagi taluk of Dharwad district in the Indian state of Karnataka. Sangameshwara is located 10 km west to Kalaghatagi town.

Demographics
As of 2001 India census, Sangameshwara had a population of 1,953 with 1,011 males and 942 females and 321 Households.

Importance
Sangemeshwara is famous for the 11th century Kalmeshara Temple.

See also

 Kalaghatagi
 Dharwad

References

External links 
 www.dharwad.nic.in

Villages in Dharwad district